The 1968 U.S. Professional Indoor, also known as the Philadelphia Indoor, was a WCT men's tennis tournament played on indoor carpet courts. It was played at the Spectrum in Philadelphia, Pennsylvania in the United States. It was the inaugural edition of the tournament and was held from February 5 through February 11, 1968. Manuel Santana won the singles title and commented that the slow rubber-like surface suited his game.

Finals

Singles

 Manuel Santana defeated  Jan Leschly 8–6, 6–3
 It was Santana's only title of the year and the 1st of his professional career.

Doubles
No doubles competition was held but on the final day a doubles exhibition match was played.
 Arthur Ashe /  Charlie Pasarell defeated  Thomaz Koch /  Torben Ulrich 6–3, 12–10

References

U.S. Pro Indoor
U.S. Professional Indoor
U.S. Professional Indoor
U.S. Professional Indoor
U.S. Professional Indoor